The Duhok Dam is an earth-fill embankment dam on the Duhok River just north of Duhok in Duhok Governorate, Iraq. The dam was completed in 1988 with the primary purpose of providing water for irrigation.

See also
List of dams and reservoirs in Iraq

References

Dams in Iraq
Earth-filled dams
Dohuk Governorate
Geography of Iraqi Kurdistan
Dams completed in 1988
1988 establishments in Iraq
Tourist attractions in Iraqi Kurdistan